The Flintstones is a 1994 video game adaptation of the live-action 1994 film The Flintstones. It was released on Super NES, Game Boy, and Genesis.

Gameplay 

The Flintstones is a 2D platforming game where the player controls Fred Flintstone who must rescue Pebbles, Bam-Bam, Barney, and Wilma from the evil Cliff Vandercave. All three versions feature different levels and enemies.

Development 
The Game Boy version developed by Twilight and the SNES version developed by Ocean Software were both published by Ocean, in 1994 and 1995 respectively. A Genesis version developed by Foley Hi-Tech was planned to be published by Ocean, but was instead briefly distributed exclusively via Sega Channel in North America in 1995.

Reception 

Next Generation reviewed the SNES version, rating it three stars out of five, and stated that "the game (as the movie) could've used more innovation, but it looks good, and plays well". GamePro praised its graphics, multi-layered parallax scrolling, and "solid" controls, calling it overall a "fun" and "lightweight" game. Electronic Gaming Monthlys review crew gave it an average score of 5.8/10 from five reviewers, calling the game just a "routine sidescroller", and said that Taito's previous Flintstones games with graphics based on the cartoon were better, and that the graphics based on the movie "really [don't] work". VideoGames gave it an overall score of 8 out of 10, calling it a "solid" platformer with good replay value and particularly praising the "fluid" animations and "satisfying" sound effects. GameFan gave it an average score of 82% from three reviewers, who praised its difficulty and varied gameplay mechanics. All three reviewers heavily praised the graphics, with one comparing Fred's fluid animations to that of Prince of Persia (1989).

See also 
 List of The Flintstones video games

References 

1994 video games
Cancelled Sega Genesis games
Game Boy games
Ocean Software games
Platform games
Super Nintendo Entertainment System games
Twilight (company) games
Video games based on adaptations
Video games based on films
Video games based on The Flintstones
Video games developed in the United Kingdom
Video games developed in the United States